John Newcombe defeated the defending champion Jimmy Connors in the final, 7–5, 3–6, 6–4, 7–6(9–7) to win the men's singles tennis title at the 1975 Australian Open. Newcombe became the first man in the Open Era to win a major after saving match points, saving three against Tony Roche in the semifinals.

Seeds
The seeded players are listed below. John Newcombe is the champion; others show the round in which they were eliminated.

 Jimmy Connors (finalist)
 John Newcombe (champion)
 Tony Roche (semifinals)
 John Alexander (quarterfinals)
 Ross Case (first round)
 Alexander Metreveli (quarterfinals)
 Geoff Masters (quarterfinals)
 Phil Dent (second round)

Draw

Key
 Q = Qualifier
 WC = Wild card
 LL = Lucky loser
 r = Retired

Final eight

Section 1

Section 2

Section 3

Section 4

External links
 Association of Tennis Professionals (ATP) – 1975 Australian Open Men's Singles draw
 Australian Open (1975) on ausopen.com 
 1975 Australian Open – Men's draws and results at the International Tennis Federation

Mens singles
Australian Open (tennis) by year – Men's singles